Cesare Nebbia (c.1536–c.1614) was an Italian painter from Orvieto who painted in a Mannerist style.

Biography
Nebbia was born in Orvieto. He trained with Girolamo Muziano, and under this master, he helped complete a flurry of decoration that was added to the Cathedral of Orvieto in the 1560s. Almost all the remaining work in Orvieto is now in the Museo del Duomo.

Nebbia and Muziano became active in many of the premier projects in late 16th-century Rome. Along with Muziano's other assistant, Giovanni Guerra, they decorated the Gregorian Chapel in the St Peter's Basilica during the pontificate of Gregory XIII (1572–1585). Other Mannerist painters that were involved in this enterprise were Taddeo and Federico Zuccari, Niccolò Circignani, and Hendrick van den Broeck (known as Arrigo Fiammingo).

The fresco decorations in Palazzo Simonelli in Torre San Severo (near Orvieto) have been attributed to Nebbia. In 1576, he painted a Resurrection of Lazarus for the Church of Santa Maria dei Servi in Città della Pieve.

During the pontificate of Pope Sixtus V (1585–1590), Nebbia and Guerra together supervised the two major fresco decorations commissioned by this papacy: at the church of Santa Maria Maggiore,  construction and decoration of the Capella Sistina; and in the Lateran palace and church of San Giovanni in Laterano, the refurbishment of the Scala Sancta and the chapel of St. Lawrence.

The Sistine chapel of Santa Maria Maggiore was intended as the burial chapel for pope Sixtus, which held the relic of the Nativity (the original Presepe or manger crib), and should not to be confused with the more famous Vatican counterpart, the Sistine chapel. The decoration for the church, and for the chapel, shows scenes of the Life of the Virgin.

The project for the Scala Sancta involved an amalgam of structures, it comprises five parallel staircases leading to a common corridor, opening up to chapels, the central one of which was the private papal chapel of St. Laurence or Sancta Sanctorum of the gothic Lateran Palace, and held numerous relics, including the icon of Santissimi Salvatore Acheiropoieton (that is, not painted by human hands). These staircases were said to have been originally from the palace of Pilate in Jerusalem.

In the fresco decoration at Santa Maria Maggiore, that began in 1586, Baglione identifies as active in the work the following ten painters:
 Cesare Nebbia
 Hendrick van den Broek
 Angelo from Orvieto
 Ercolino from Bologna
 Salvatore Fontana
 Lattanzio Mainardi
 Ferdinando Sermei
 Giacomo Stella
 Giovanni Battista Pozzo
 Paris Nogari.

For the project at the Scala Sancta, an overlapping crew of artists was also employed to decorate frescoes including Giovanni Baglione himself, Stella, Giovanni Battista Pozzo, Nogari, as well as Prospero Orsi, Ferraù Fenzoni, Paul Bril, Paolo Guidotti, Giovanni Battista Ricci, Cesare Torelli, Antonio Vivarini, Andrea Lilio, Cesare and Vicenzo Conti, Baldassare Croce, Ventura Salimbeni, and Antonio Scalvati. Numerous preliminary drawings by Nebbia exist for these frescoes.

Nebbia helped paint galleries in Vatican libraries including the ceilings of map gallery. During the papacy of Clement VIII he designed the pendentive mosaics depicting the Evangelists Matthew and Mark for St. Peter's Basilica. He painted a Crucifixion for Borghese chapel in the church of Trinità dei Monti. He painted a Resurrection for San Giacomo degli Spagnoli. He painted a Coronation of the Virgin for the church of Santa Maria dei Monti.

Along with the painter known as il Bertoia, Federico Zuccari and others, he helped fresco the walls of the Oratorio del Gonfalone in Rome. He also contributed to the decoration of the Oratory of Santissimo Crocifisso.

In 1603-1604, he moved to Milan where he worked for Federico Borromeo painting a series of frescoes on the life of the Blessed Carlo Borromeo for various sites, including the Collegio Borromeo in Pavia, the collegiata di Arona, and the Palazzo Borromeo on Isola Bella.

References

Footnotes

1530s births
1610s deaths
People from Orvieto
Italian Mannerist painters
16th-century Italian painters
Italian male painters
17th-century Italian painters